Denis Komivi Amuzu-Dzakpah (born 10 October 1943 in Kpogame Tahasi) is a Togolese Catholic bishop.

He was ordained as a Priest of Lomé on 22 May 1972. He appointed as Archbishop of Lomé on 8 June 2007, and he was ordained as bishop on 15 August 2007.

Pope Francis accepted his resignation on 23 November 2019.

References

External links

Togolese Roman Catholic bishops
1943 births
Living people
Roman Catholic archbishops of Lomé
21st-century Togolese people